Bruce Herman (born 1953) is an artist who holds the Lothlórien Distinguished Chair in the art department of Gordon College. He achieved both a Bachelor of Fine Arts, and a Master of Fine Arts from the School for the Arts at Boston University, where he studied under Philip Guston, James Weeks, David Aronson, Reed Kay, and Arthur Polonsky.  He joined the faculty at Gordon College in 1984 and was awarded various chairs and positions until he was awarded the aforementioned position. His work has been exhibited around the world, and has paintings housed in the Vatican Museum of Modern Religious Art, the Cincinnati Museum of Fine Arts, and the DeCordova Museum. Between 1983 and 2011 he has been a part of more than 50 exhibitions, and has been invited to do nearly 50 lecture series. He is working on a series of paintings for an artistic, literary, and theological tour in response to T.S. Eliot's  set of four poems known as the Four Quartets.

Notes

References

External links
 Bruceherman.com

1953 births
American artists
Gordon College (Massachusetts) faculty
Living people